Joseph Hazard (May 21, 1728 – April 31, 1790) was a justice of the Rhode Island Supreme Court from May 1786 to May 1787, succeeding Peter Phillips in the office.

Hazard's name first appears in the Colonial records in 1756, as Deputy from South Kingstown, Rhode Island. In the same year he was appointed Lieutenant-Colonel of militia for Kings County. From 1761 until 1777, he "was Assistant, with scarcely an interval". In 1770, he and Stephen Hopkins formed a committee to examine a complaint of the Collector and Comptroller of the Port of Newport. In 1786 and 1787 he was Associate Judge of the Supreme Court.

Rhode Island historian Wilkins Updike said of Hazard:

Hazard was on the court when the Rhode Island General Assembly enacted the "Paper Money Laws" of 1786, and was one of the paper-money party. However, when the question of the constitutionality of these laws came before the court in the case of Trevett v. Weeden, the court declared the Paper-Money Tender Laws unconstitutional and void. The General Assembly ordered the Court to be arraigned before them for a contempt of legislative power, and they were required to give their respective reasons for overthrowing the laws of the Legislature that had created them. When called on to explain his decions, Hazard rose and said:

Updike described this as "an instance where the heroic firmness of a few men saved the reputation of a State."

Joseph Hazard married Hannah Nichols, daughter of Deputy-Governor Jonathan Nichols, on September 28, 1760. He died at the age of 61.

References

Justices of the Rhode Island Supreme Court
1728 births
1790 deaths
Hazard family of Rhode Island